Ridge Hill is a mountain in Dukes County, Massachusetts. Abel Hill is located southwest and Peaked Hill is located west-northwest of Ridge Hill.

References

Mountains of Massachusetts
Mountains of Dukes County, Massachusetts